This is a list of symphonies in E major written by notable composers.

See also

For symphonies in E minor, see List of symphonies in E minor. For other keys, see List of symphonies by key.

Notes

References
Bryan, Paul, Johann Waṅhall, Viennese Symphonist: His Life and His Musical Environment Stuyvesant: Pendragon Press (1997)
Hill, George R.: "Thematic Index" in The Symphony 1720–1840 Series B — Volume X, ed. Barry S. Brooks (New York & London, 1981)

E major
Symphonies